Goodyear may relate to:

Companies 
 Goodyear Tire and Rubber Company
 Goodyear Redwood Company, foresting company operated from 1916 to 1932
 Edward Goodyear, a florist company in London, England
 Goodyear Lumber Company, one of many lumber and railway companies owned by Charles W. Goodyear

People 
 Goodyear (surname)
 Goodyear family

Places 
 Goodyear, Arizona, a city in the United States
 Goodyear Ballpark, a baseball field owned by the city of Goodyear
 Phoenix Goodyear Airport, a public airport nearby the city of Goodyear
 Goodyear Village, Arizona, of the Gila River Indian Community
 Goodyear Airdock, located in Akron, Ohio
 Goodyear Block, a commercial building in Manchester, Michigan
 Goodyear Polymer Center, a research center of the University of Akron
 Goodyear Thunderdome, motor racing circuit in Melbourne, Australia

Sports 
 Goodyear Centennials, a baseball team in Goodyear, Arizona
 Goodyear Eagles, a cricket team in South Africa now known as the Knights
 Goodyear League, a European basketball league now known as the Adriatic Basketball Association
 Goodyear Silents, a semi-pro football team of deaf players, from 1915 to 1927
 Detroit Bright's Goodyears, a minor league ice hockey team from 1945 to 1949

Other uses 
 Charles Goodyear Medal, award recognizing scientists in the rubber industry
 Goodyear MPP, a supercomputer built by Goodyear Aerospace in 1983

See also